The CEA Paris-Saclay (formerly CEA Saclay) center is one of nine centers belonging to the French Alternative Energies and Atomic Energy Commission (CEA). The Saclay site hosts the administrative headquarters of the CEA. Historically, it was the heart of French nuclear research since Frederic Joliot-Curie founded it after the Second World War. Its campus was designed by the architect Auguste Perret.

It is now a part of the confederation of Paris-Saclay University, along with other organizations including CentraleSupélec, CNRS, ENS Paris-Saclay, HEC Paris, and the IHES.

Research 
The complex employs more than 7,000 scientists (including other smaller Île-de-France sites) and is located in the Essonne department of northern France, south of Paris on the Saclay Plateau.

The research carried out ranges from fundamental research to applied research and, thanks to the Orpheus research reactor, lasers and magnetic resonance research into the State of Matter.

Research at Saclay is focussed on different topics: 
 Applied nuclear research: Research is carried out to optimise current and future French nuclear reactors using the Osiris experimental reactor and the Tamaris earthquake simulation laboratory as well as further research into nuclear waste management.
 Technology research: Research into IT systems used in nuclear installations, man-machine interface as well as sensor technology.
 Health research: Research into the effects of radioactivity on living cells and molecules, protein engineering and Medical imaging.
 Environmental research: Research into the effects of climate change and greenhouse gases.
 Fundamental Research.

Notable subsidiaries 
 Institut national des sciences et techniques nucléaires (National Institute for Nuclear Science and Technology) or INSTN which is dedicated to the academic and professional training in the field of atomic energy.
 NeuroSpin (fr) is a neuroimaging research center with some of the most powerful MRI machines in the world

People 
 Jules Gueron, first director of the CEA's nuclear research center
 Jean-Baptiste Waldner, alumnus
 Étienne Klein, physicist, philosopher of science, author, and radio host

References

External links
 Official website of Saclay in English

Nuclear history of France
Nuclear research institutes in France